Daniel Nathan may refer to:
Daniel A. Nathan, American scholar of cultural studies
Daniel O. Nathan, American philosopher
Daniel Nathan, birth name of one of the two authors who wrote under the joint pseudonym Ellery Queen